Suzanne Levine may refer to:
 Suzanne Levine (podiatrist), American podiatrist and foot surgeon
 Suzanne Jill Levine, American writer, poet, literary translator and scholar
 Suzanne Braun Levine, American author and editor

See also
 Suzan G. LeVine, American businesswoman and diplomat